Ethiopian Pegasus is an animal from Medieval bestiaries. According to Pliny the Elder, they were a breed of two-horned; winged horses from Ethiopia. It was born on an island in the Red Sea off the coast of Eritrea.

See also 
 Pegasus
 Winged Unicorn

References 

Medieval European legendary creatures

Pegasus
Horses in mythology
African legendary creatures